New York's 9th congressional district is a congressional district for the United States House of Representatives in New York City, represented by Yvette Clarke.

The district is located entirely within Brooklyn. It includes the neighborhoods of Brownsville, Crown Heights, East Flatbush, Flatbush, Kensington, Park Slope, Prospect Heights, Midwood, Sheepshead Bay, Marine Park, Gerritsen Beach, and Prospect Lefferts Gardens. Prospect Park, Grand Army Plaza and the Grand Army Plaza Greenmarket, the worldwide headquarters of the Chabad-Lubavitch Hasidic community, and the Brooklyn Children's Museum are located within this district, as well as, in the Prospect Heights neighborhood, the Brooklyn Museum of Art, the Brooklyn Botanic Garden, and the Central Library, or main branch, of the Brooklyn Public Library.

Prior to 2013, the district consisted primarily of middle-class white neighborhoods, including large Jewish, Italian, Irish, and Russian populations, in southern Brooklyn and south central Queens. Before redistricting, the Queens Tribune found that the district increasingly swung Republican following the September 11 attacks in 2001, when many police and firefighters were lost from the Rockaways. Its rightward shift was also attributed to the increasing tendency of Orthodox Jews to vote for Republicans. Its representation in Congress was reliably Democratic for decades, electing prominent liberals such as Chuck Schumer and Anthony Weiner, and, prior to that, Emanuel Celler and Elizabeth Holtzman (when the district was differently numbered). Briefly bucking the trend, Republican Bob Turner succeeded Weiner, who resigned on June 21, 2011, after winning the special election on September 13, 2011. However, the previous 9th District was eliminated soon thereafter, after New York lost two districts in the redistricting cycle resulting from the 2010 Census, and its territory was divided among several neighboring districts.

After redistricting, Yvette Clarke now represents the district. The district has an African American majority, and also includes most of the territory previously within the 11th District. It includes significant portions of Midwood, Brooklyn, however, that was previously within the 9th. In the 1980s, the district was based in Astoria and surrounding neighborhoods in Queens. This iteration of the district gained national attention in 1984, when its Representative Geraldine Ferraro became the vice presidential candidate of the Democratic Party.

Voting

History

The 9th was historically a Queens district.  Part of the old 9th became the 7th District in the 1992 redistricting when the present 9th absorbed much of the old 10th District based in Brooklyn.

 1797–1803: Montgomery County
 1803–1809: 
 1809–1913: Montgomery County
 1913–1945: Parts of Brooklyn, Queens
 1945–1963: Parts of Brooklyn
 1963–1993: Parts of Queens
 1993–2013: Parts of Brooklyn, Queens
 2013–present: Parts of Brooklyn

List of members representing the district

Recent election results
In New York elections, there are minor parties. Certain parties will invariably endorse either the Republican or Democratic candidate for every office; hence, the state electoral results contain both the party votes, and the final candidate votes (Listed as "Recap").

Historical district boundaries

See also

List of United States congressional districts
New York's congressional districts
United States congressional delegations from New York

Notes

References

 Congressional Biographical Directory of the United States 1774–present
 
 
 
 
 

09
Rockaway, Queens
Constituencies established in 1793
1793 establishments in New York (state)